Beach Chair may refer to:

"Beach Chair" (song), a 2006 song by Jay-Z and Chris Martin
Beach Chair (film test), a 1986 film test by Pixar
Beach Chair (album), an album by Raaginder